Ramu is a Malayalam film actor. He has acted in more than 100 films. He acts mainly in villain roles. His son Devdas is also an actor, who is notable for appearing in the lead role in 2007 Malayalam fantasy film Athishayan.

Background
Ramu was born as the eldest among four children to Kochunni Nair and Devakiamma at Tavanur, Edappal. Malayalam actor Sukumaran was his elder cousin.

He married Reshmi in 1995. They have a daughter, Amritha and son Devadas, who was a child artist, acted in 2007 Malayalam movies Anandabhairavi and Athisayan. They live in Peramangalam near Thrissur. He had written screenplay for the movie Kalikkoottukar released in 2018.

Filmography
As an actor

 Pathonpatham Noottandu (2022) as Diwan
 Kaapa (2022)
 Salute(2022)
 Aaraattu (2022)
 Forensic (2020)
 Ente Ummante Peru(2018)
 Naam (2018)
 Pava (2016)
 Manglish (film) (2014)
 Ezhu Sundara Rathrikal (2013)
 Caribbeans (2013) as D.I.G.
 Ayalum Njanum Thammil (2012)
 Grandmaster (2012)
 Mr. Pavanayi 99.99 (2012)
 Yaathraykkoduvil (2013)
 Simhasanam (2012)
 Cobra (2012)
 Thattathin Marayathu (2012)
 Vellaripravinte Changathi (2011)
 Arjunan Saakshi (2011)
 Kaaryasthan (2010)
 Pranchiyettan & the Saint (2010) as Bahuleyan
 Nilavu (2010)
 Magic lamp (2008)
 Roudram (2008)
 Black Cat (2007)
 Chotta Mumbai (2007)
 Athisayan (2007)
 Red Salute (2006)
 Yes Your Honour (2006)
 Bus Conductor (2005)
 Vettam (2004)
 Chathikkatha Chanthu (2004)
 Perumazhakkalam (2004)
 Black (2004)
 Sharja To Sharja (2001)
 Raavanaprabhu (2001)
 Aaraam Thampuran (1997) as Shelly
 Special Squad (1995) as Bony
 Sukham Sukhakaram (1994)
 Kambolam (1994)
 Butterflies (1993)
 Devasuram (1993)
 Apaaratha (1992) as Jayapalan
 Aswathy (1991) as Satheesh
 Kaumaara Swapnangal (1991)
 Inspector Balram (1991) as Siddique
 Prosecution (1990)
 Niyamam Enthucheyyum (1990)
 Arhatha (1990)
 Oru Vadakkan Veeragatha (1989)
 Ivalente Kaamuki (1989)
 Moonnam Pakkam (1988)
 Sankhanaadam (1988)
 Bheekaran (1988) as SI Kannan
 Maanasa Maine Varu (1987)
 Avalude Kadha (1987)
 Neeyallengil Njan (1987) as Vinod
 Bhagavaan (1986)
 Onnu Randu Moonnu (1986)Ithramathram'' (1986) as Vijayan
 Sakhavu (1986)
 Ente Shabdam (1986) as Sudhakaran
 Ayalvasi Oru Daridravasi (1986)
 Kulambadikal (1986)
 Ottayaan (1985)
 Revenge (1985)
 Njaan Piranna Naattil (1985) as Jayan
 Aazhi (1985)
 Uyarum Njaan Naadaage (1985)
 Black Mail ) (1985)
 Thirakkil Alppa Samayam (1984) as Majeed
 Theere Pratheekshikkathe (1984) as Raghu
 Ente Kalithozhan (1984)
 Aashamsakalode (1984)
 Minimol Vathikkaanil (1984) as James
 Poomadhathe Pennu (1984)
 Sagaram Shantham (1983)
 Aadyathe Anuraagam (1983)
 Mortuary (1983)
 Lekhayude Maranam Oru Flashback (1983)
 Oru Madapravinte Katha (1983)
 Engine Nee Marakkum (1983)
Aana (1983) as George
 Ormaykkaay (1982)

As a writer
Kalikkoottukar (2019)

References

Sources
 malayalamcinema.com, Official website of AMMA, Malayalam Film news, Malayalam Movie Actors & Actress, Upcoming Malayalam movies
 Check out lists of Movies by #Ramu(MalayalamActor) #Filmography
 Ramu Profile
 mallumovies.org

External links

 Ramu at MSI

Living people
Indian male film actors
Male actors from Thrissur
Male actors in Malayalam cinema
20th-century Indian male actors
21st-century Indian male actors
1953 births